Churu Assembly constituency is one of constituencies of Rajasthan Legislative Assembly in the Churu (Lok Sabha constituency).

Churu Constituency covers all voters from Churu tehsil.

References

See also 
 Member of the Legislative Assembly (India)

Churu district
Assembly constituencies of Rajasthan